Pay Box Adventure is a 1936 British crime film directed by W. P. Kellino and starring Syd Crossley, Marjorie Corbett and Roxie Russell. It was made at Elstree Studios as a quota quickie.

Cast
 Syd Crossley as Tom Furlong  
 Marjorie Corbett as Mary Blake  
 Roxie Russell as Enid Soames  
 Billy Watts as Jimmy Trevor  
 Eric Fawcett as Sidney Parke  
 Molly Hamley-Clifford as Mrs. Bartlett  
 George Turner as Gus

References

Bibliography
 Chibnall, Steve. Quota Quickies: The Birth of the British 'B' Film. British Film Institute, 2007.
 Low, Rachael. Filmmaking in 1930s Britain. George Allen & Unwin, 1985.
 Wood, Linda. British Films, 1927-1939. British Film Institute, 1986.

External links
 

1936 films
1930s crime comedy films
1930s English-language films
Films directed by W. P. Kellino
Films shot at Station Road Studios, Elstree
Quota quickies
British and Dominions Studios films
British crime comedy films
British black-and-white films
1936 comedy films
1930s British films